Unicode input is the insertion of a specific Unicode character on a computer by a user; it is a common way to input characters not directly supported by a physical keyboard. Unicode characters can be produced either by selecting them from a display or by typing a certain sequence of keys on a physical keyboard.  In addition, a character produced by one of these methods in one web page or document can be copied into another. In contrast to ASCII's 96 element character set (which it contains), Unicode encodes hundreds of thousands of graphemes (characters) from almost all of the world's written languages and many other signs and symbols besides.

A Unicode input system must provide for a large repertoire of characters, ideally all valid Unicode code points. This is different from a keyboard layout which defines keys and their combinations only for a limited number of characters appropriate for a certain locale.

Unicode numbers 
Unicode characters are distinguished by code points, which are conventionally represented by "U+" followed by four, five or six hexadecimal digits, for example U+00AE or U+1D310. Characters in the Basic Multilingual Plane (BMP), containing modern scripts – including many Chinese and Japanese characters – and many symbols, have a 4-digit code. Historic scripts, but also many modern symbols and pictographs (such as emoticons, emojis, playing cards and many CJK characters) have 5-digit codes.

Availability 

An application can display a character only if it can access a font which contains a glyph for the character. Very few fonts have full Unicode coverage; most only contain the glyphs needed to support a few writing systems. However,  most modern browsers and other text-processing applications are able to display multilingual content because they perform font substitution, automatically switching to a fallback font when necessary to display characters which are not supported in the current font. Which fonts are used for fallback and the thoroughness of Unicode coverage varies by software and operating system; some software will search for a suitable glyph in all of the installed fonts, others only search within certain fonts.

If an application does not have access to a glyph, the character will usually be shown as the font's ".notdef" glyph  which often appears as an empty box (nicknamed "tofu" based on the shape), a box with an X in it, or a box with a question mark in it.

Selection from a screen 

Many systems provide a way to select Unicode characters visually. ISO/IEC 14755 refers to this as a screen-selection entry method.

Microsoft Windows has provided a Unicode version of the Character Map program, appearing in the consumer edition since XP. This is limited to characters in the Basic Multilingual Plane (BMP). Characters are searchable by Unicode character name, and the table can be limited to a particular code block. More advanced third-party tools of the same type are also available (a notable freeware example is BabelMap, which supports all Unicode characters). On most Linux desktop environments, equivalent tools – such as gucharmap (GNOME) or kcharselect (KDE) – are available.

Generally these tools let the user "copy" the selected characters into the clipboard, and then paste them into the document, rather than pretending to directly type them.

It is often practical to just find the desired character on the web or in another document, and copy and paste it from there.

Decimal input 

Some programs running in Microsoft Windows, including recent versions of Word and Wordpad, can produce characters from their Unicode code points expressed in decimal and entered on the numeric keypad with the  key held down. For example, the Euro sign  has 20AC as its hexadecimal code point, which is 8364 in decimal, so  will produce the symbol. Similarly,  produces the double-struck character .

Decimal code points in the range 160 –255 must be entered with a leading zero (so that the Windows code page is chosen) and furthermore the Windows code page must be set to match Unicode (CP1252 must be used).

In programs in which Alt codes over 255 do not work, the character retrieved usually corresponds to the remainder when the number is divided by 256.

The text editor Vim allows characters to be specified by two-character mnemonics (confusingly called "digraphs" by Vim developers). The installed set can be augmented by custom mnemonics defined for arbitrary code points, specified in decimal.

See below for use of decimal code points in HTML.

Hexadecimal input 

Clause 5.1 of ISO/IEC 14755 describes a Basic method whereby a beginning sequence is followed by the hex number representation of the code point and the ending sequence. Most modern systems have some method to emulate this, sometimes limited to four digits (thus only the Basic Multilingual Plane).

In Microsoft Windows 

Hexadecimal Unicode input can be enabled by adding a string type (REG_SZ) value called EnableHexNumpad to the registry key HKEY_CURRENT_USER\Control Panel\Input Method and assigning the value data 1 to it. Users will need to log off and back in after editing the registry for this input method to start working. (In versions earlier than Vista, users needed to reboot for it to start working.)

Unicode characters can then be entered by holding down , and typing  on the numeric keypad, followed by the hexadecimal code, and then releasing . This may not work for 5-digit hexadecimal codes like . Some versions of Windows may require the digits 0-9 to be typed on the numeric keypad or require NumLock to be on.

In some applications (Word, WordPad and LibreOffice programs)  will replace the hexadecimal number to the left of the cursor with the matching Unicode character. Unless it is six hexadecimal digits long, the code must not be preceded by any digit or letters a–f as they may be treated as part of the code to be converted.

This facility enables Unicode characters to be entered in other applications: one can create a desired character in WordPad, for example, and then cut and paste it wherever desired.

AutoHotkey commands can specify Unicode characters in hex.  For example, the command Send {U+2014} will insert an em dash in a text field in the active window.

In MacOS 

Hex input of Unicode must be enabled. In Mac OS 8.5 and later, one can choose the Unicode Hex Input keyboard layout; in OS X (10.10) Yosemite, this can be added in Keyboard → Input Sources.

Holding down , one types the four-digit hexadecimal Unicode code point and the equivalent character appears; one can then release the  key.

In X11 (Linux and other Unix variants including ChromeOS) 

In many applications one or both of the following methods work to directly input Unicode characters:
 Holding  and typing  followed by the hex digits, then releasing .

This is supported by GTK and Qt applications, and possibly others. In ChromeOS, this is an operating system function.

In platform-independent applications 
 In LibreOffice 5.1 onwards, the  method described above for Windows works.
 In Opera versions that use the Presto layout engine—i.e. up to and including version 12.xx—, entering the hexadecimal number of the desired symbol or character and then pressing  (alternative shortcut  on macOS).
 In the Vim editor, in insert mode, the user first types   (for codepoints up to 4 hex digits long; using    for longer), then types in the hexadecimal number of the symbol or character desired, and it will be converted into the symbol.

HTML 

In HTML and XML, character codes to be rendered as characters are prefixed by ampersand and number sign (&#), and are followed by a semicolon. The code point can be either in decimal or in hexadecimal; in the latter case it is preceded by an "x". Leading zeros may be omitted. A number of characters may be represented by a named entity.

Example: In HTML/XML, the copyright sign © (U+00A9) may be coded as:
 &#169; (decimal code point)
 &#xa9; (hexadecimal code point)
 &copy; (entity name)

This works in many pieces of software that accept HTML markup, such as Thunderbird and Wikipedia editing.

See also 
 ASCII
 Digraphs and trigraphs
 AltGr key
 Compose key

Notes

References 

Input
Input methods